Louis Orvoën (9 December 1919 – 21 September 1994) was a French politician.

Orvoën was a member of the National Assembly from 1946 to 1951. He returned to the legislative body in 1956, sat until 1968, and was later elected to Senate between 1971 and 1980.

In 1978, he succeeded André Colin, who died in office, as President of the General Council of Finistère. Upon Orvoën's retirement in 1988, Charles Miossec replaced him.

References

1919 births
1994 deaths
Deputies of the 1st National Assembly of the French Fourth Republic
Deputies of the 2nd National Assembly of the French Fourth Republic
Deputies of the 3rd National Assembly of the French Fourth Republic
Deputies of the 1st National Assembly of the French Fifth Republic
Deputies of the 3rd National Assembly of the French Fifth Republic
Senators of Finistère
French Senators of the Fifth Republic
Mayors of places in Brittany
Popular Republican Movement politicians
Democratic Centre (France) politicians